The 1977 World Figure Skating Championships were held in Tokyo, Japan from March 1 to 6. At the event, sanctioned by the International Skating Union, medals were awarded in men's singles, ladies' singles, pair skating, and ice dancing.

The ISU Representative was Jacques Favart of France. The ISU Technical Delegates were Hermann Schiechtl of West Germany.

Medal tables

Medalists

Medals by country

Results

Men

Referee:
 Josef Dědič 

Assistant Referee:
 Kinuko Ueno 

Judges:
 Gerhardt Bubnik 
 Erika Schiechtl 
 Geoffrey Yates 
 David Dore 
 Valentin Piseev 
 Goro Ishimaru 
 Edith M. Shoemaker 
 Helga von Wiecki 
 Sydney R. Croll 

Substitute judge:
 Monique Georgelin

Ladies

Referee:
 Sonia Bianchetti 

Assistant Referee:
 Benjamin Wright 

Judges:
 Giovanni De Mori 
 Günter Teichmann 
 Jürg Wilhelm 
 Geoffrey Yates 
 Yvonne S. McGowan 
 Ludwig Gassner 
 Norris Bowden 
 Leena Vainio 
 Eugen Romminger 

Substitute judge:
 Tsukasa Kimura

Pairs

Referee:
 Donald H. Gilchrist 

Assistant Referee:
 Kikuko Minami 

Judges:
 Gerhardt Bubnik 
 Erika Schiechtl 
 Geoffrey Yates 
 David Dore 
 Valentin Piseev 
 Goro Ishimaru 
 Edith M. Shoemaker 
 Helga von Wiecki 
 Sydney R. Croll 

Substitute judge:
 Monique Georgelin

Ice dancing

Referee:
 Lawrence Demmy 

Assistant Referee:
 George J. Blundun 

Judges:
 Ludwig Gassner 
 Pamela Davis 
 Klára Kozári 
 Mary Louise Wright 
 Ennio Bernazzali 
 Irina Absliamova 
 Gerhardt Bubnik 
 Tsukasa Kimura 
 Joyce Hisey 

Substitute judge:
 Eugen Romminger

Sources
 Result list provided by the ISU
 US Pair Is 3d After Start of World Skating
 Miss Rodnina, Zaitsev Win Fifth Straight Skating Title

World Figure Skating Championships
World Figure Skating Championships
World Figure Skating Championships
World Figure Skating Championships
International figure skating competitions hosted by Japan
Sports competitions in Tokyo
World Figure Skating Championships
World Figure Skating Championships